Echinorhynchus is a genus of acanthocephalan parasitic worms. They parasitize a wide variety of fishes from both marine and fresh waters. The intermediate host is usually a crustacean.

 Echinorhynchus abyssicola Dollfus, 1931
 Echinorhynchus acanthotrias Linstow, 1883
 Echinorhynchus alcedinis Westrumb, 1821
 Echinorhynchus armoricanus Golvan, 1969
 Echinorhynchus astacifluviatilis Diesing, 1851
 Echinorhynchus attenuatus Linton, 1891
 Echinorhynchus baeri Kostylev, 1928 
 Echinorhynchus bipennis Kaiser, 1893
 Echinorhynchus blenni Rudolphi, 1810
 Echinorhynchus briconi Machado, 1959
 Echinorhynchus calloti Golvan, 1969
 Echinorhynchus canyonensis Huffman and Kleiver, 1977
 Echinorhynchus cestodicola Linstow, 1905
 Echinorhynchus chierchiae Monticelli, 1889
 Echinorhynchus cinctulus Porta, 1905
 Echinorhynchus corrugatus Sars, 1885
 Echinorhynchus cotti Yamaguti, 1939
 Echinorhynchus cryophilus (Sokolowskaja, 1962)
 Echinorhynchus debenhami Leiper and Atkinson, 1914
 Echinorhynchus dendrocopi Westrumb, 1821
 Echinorhynchus diffuens Zenker, 1832
 Echinorhynchus dissimilis Yamaguti, 1939
 Echinorhynchus eperlani Linstow, 1884
 Echinorhynchus gadi Zoega, 1776
 Echinorhynchus galbulae Diesing, 1851
 Echinorhynchus garzae Zeder, 1803
 Echinorhynchus gazae Gmelin, 1790
 Echinorhynchus gomesi Machado, 1948
 Echinorhynchus gracilis Machado, 1948
 Echinorhynchus gymnocyprii Wang and Yang, 1981
 Echinorhynchus hexacanthus Dujardin, 1845
 Echinorhynchus hexagrammi Beava, 1965
 Echinorhynchus inflexus Cobbold, 1861
 Echinorhynchus jucundus Travassos, 1923
 Echinorhynchus kushiroensis Fujita, 1921
 Echinorhynchus labri Rudolphi, 1819
 Echinorhynchus lageniformis Ekbaum, 1838
 Echinorhynchus lateralis Leidy, 1851
 Echinorhynchus laurentianus Roland, 1957
 Echinorhynchus leidyi Van Cleave, 1924
 Echinorhynchus lendix (Phipps, 1774)
 Echinorhynchus lenoki Achmerov, et al., 1941
 Echinorhynchus lotellae Yamaguti, 1939
 Echinorhynchus melanoglaeae Dollfus, 1960
 Echinorhynchus monticelli Porta, 1904
 Echinorhynchus nardoi Molin, 1859
 Echinorhynchus nitzschi Giebel, 1866
 Echinorhynchus oblitus Golvan, 1969
 Echinorhynchus orestiae Neveu-Lemaire, 1905
 Echinorhynchus orientalis Kaw, 1951
 Echinorhynchus paranensis Machado, 1959
 Echinorhynchus parasiluri Fukui, 1929
 Echinorhynchus pardi Huxley, 1902
 Echinorhynchus pari Rudolphi, 1819
 Echinorhynchus peleci Grimm, 1870
 Echinorhynchus platessae Rudolphi, 1809
 Echinorhynchus platessoides Gmelin, 1790
 Echinorhynchus pleuronectis Gmelin, 1790
 Echinorhynchus pleuronectisplatessoides Viborg, 1795
 Echinorhynchus praetextus Molin, 1858
 Echinorhynchus pupa Linstow, 1905
 Echinorhynchus rhenanus (Golvan, 1969)
 Echinorhynchus rhytidodes Monticelli, 1905
 Echinorhynchus robustus Datta, 1928
 Echinorhynchus salmonis Mueller, 1784
 Echinorhynchus salobrensis Machado, 1948
 Echinorhynchus sciaenae Rudolphi, 1819
 Echinorhynchus scopis Gmelin, 1790
 Echinorhynchus scorpaenae Rudolphi, 1819
 Echinorhynchus serpentulus Grimm, 1870
 Echinorhynchus sipunculus Schrank, 1788
 Echinorhynchus solitarium Molin, 1858
 Echinorhynchus stridulae Goeze, 1782
 Echinorhynchus strigis Gmelin, 1782
 Echinorhynchus taeniaeforme Linstow, 1890
 Echinorhynchus tardae Rudolphi, 1809
 Echinorhynchus tenuicollis Froelich, 1802
 Echinorhynchus truttae Schrank, 1788
 Echinorhynchus urniger Dujardin, 1845
 Echinorhynchus yamagutii Golvan, 1969
 Echinorhynchus zanclorhynchi Johnston and Best, 1937

Gallery

References

Echinorhynchidae
Acanthocephala genera